Eisenstat is a surname. Notable people with the surname include:

Al Eisenstat (born 1930), American lawyer and business executive
Harry Eisenstat (1915–2003), American baseball player
Yael Eisenstat, American national security specialist and strategist

See also
Eisenstadt